Vossajazz or Vossa Jazz (established 19 December 1973) is an international jazz festival in Voss, Norway, which takes place annually during the week before Easter, and which also includes concerts throughout the year. The festival has been led by Trude Storheim since August 2007.

History 

The first festival in 1974 was held the same weekend as the World Cup in Alpine skiing at Voss. The idea was that ski and jazz fit together. Since 1986 the festival has always taken place during the palm weekend. From 2007, the festival director has been Trude Storheim.

In 1980 Vossajazz brought Rune Gustafsson and Niels-Henning Ørsted Pedersen together for a power session in the old Voss cinema. This cooperation led to the album Just The Way You Are (1980). Vossajazz includes jazz, folk and ethnic music. There is also Badnajazz for the children, Ekstremjazz (not part of Ekstremsportveko, the extreme sports week also held in Voss), Eldrejazz and UNGjaJAZZja!. In addition, the festival annually commissions a piece of music from Norwegian composers.

The 2016 edition of Vossajazz was a musical event with a blend of different impressions. The Down Beat report gives the festival splendid reviews and opens with stating: "A warm bath of synchronicity hit the lakeside town of Voss, Norway, in the heart of the 43rd annual Vossa Jazz Festival. The blissful sense of convergence of elements came courtesy of respected and increasingly international Hardanger fiddle master Nils Okland, during his contribution to the long history of the festival’s keynote commissioned work (or “Tingingsverket”)."

Commissioned works 

 1978: Dag Arnesen
 1983: Egil Kapstad - Epilog
 1985: Bjørn Alterhaug - Fantasier for et miljø
 1987: Dag Arnesen - Strøtanker og røde roser
 1988: Ole Thomsen - Usynlige danser
 1989: Tore Brunborg - Tid
 1990: Arild Andersen - Sagn
 1991: Bendik Hofseth - Q
 1992: Magnetic North Orchestra - Il Cenone
 1993: Bugge Wesseltoft - A little war story
 1994: Mari Boine - Leahkastin
 1995: Veslefrekk - Nils, Per & Veslefrekk
 1996: Nils Petter Molvær - Labyrinter
 1997: Frode Alnæs - Til Voss
 1998: Misha Alperin - Night
 1999: Vigleik Storaas - Mosaikk
 2000: Ketil Bjørnstad - Grace
 2001: Eldbjørg Raknes - So much depends upon a red wheel barrow
 2002: Erlend Skomsvoll - Variasjoner
 2003: Terje Rypdal - Vossabrygg
 2004: Svein Folkvord - Across
 2005: Jan Gunnar Hoff - Free flow songs
 2006: Trygve Seim - Reiser
 2007: Berit Opheim - Ein engel går stilt
 2008: Tord Gustavsen - Restar av lukke – bitar av tru
 2009: Solveig Slettahjell - Tarpan Seasons
 2010: Karin Krog and John Surman - Songs about this and that
 2011: Mathias Eick - Voss
 2012: Karl Seglem - Som spor
 2013: Stian Carstensen - Flipp
 2014: Mats Eilertsen - Rubicon
 2015: Live Maria Roggen - Apokaluptein – The Uncovering
 2016: Nils Økland - Glødetrådar
 2017: Susanna & the Brotherhood of our Lady.
 2018: Eirik Hegdal - Musical Balloon

Vossajazzprisen 
Since 1988 the festival has honoured prominent freelance jazz musicians from Hordaland with an award, including:

 1988: Olav Dale, Voss
 1989: Ole Thomsen, Bergen
 1990: Knut Kristiansen, Bergen
 1991: Per Jørgensen, Bergen
 1992: Dag Arnesen, Bergen
 1993: Ole Hamre, Bergen
 1994: Gabriel Fliflet, Bergen
 1995: Harald Dahlstrøm, Bergen
 1996: Terje Isungset, Bergen
 1997: Frank Jakobsen, Bergen
 1998: Sigurd Ulveseth, Bergen
 1999: Helge Lilletvedt, Bergen
 2000: Ivar Kolve, Voss
 2001: Stein Inge Brækhus, Bergen
 2002: Thomas T. Dahl, Bergen
 2003: Kåre Opheim, Voss
 2004: Magne Thormodsæter, Bergen
 2005: Berit Opheim, Voss
 2006: Yngve Moe, Sotra
 2007: Snorre Bjerck, Florø
 2008: Mads Berven, Bergen
 2009: Kjetil Møster, Bergen
 2010: Stein Urheim, Bergen
 2011: Mari Kvien Brunvoll, Molde
 2012: Sigrid Moldestad, Breim in Gloppen
 2013: Tore Brunborg
 2014: Sigbjørn Apeland, Sveio
 2015: Thea Hjelmeland, Sunnfjord
 2016: Øyvind Skarbø, Stranda in Sunnmøre
 2017: Hans Petter Gundersen, Bergen
 2018: Benedicte Maurseth, Eidfjord

Vossajazz Records 
Several recordings made at the festival have been issued on Vossajazz's own label, Vossa Jazz Records.
 1996: Fliflet/Hamre Energiforsyning: Moro post mortem, live (VJ 18962)
 1998: Berit Opheim, Bjørn Kjellemyr, Einar Mjølsnes, Sigbjørn Apeland and Per Jørgensen: Fryd (VJ 980042)
 2001: Kari Bremnes and Lars Klevstrand: Tid Å Hausta Inn (VJ 980052)
 2003: Tore Brunborg: Gravity (VJ 03006-2)
 2004: Electro Ompaniet: Toskedalen (VJ 04007-2)
 2004: Svein Folkvord: Across (VJ 04008)
 2005: Electro Ompaniet: Electromecanibalism (VJ 04007-3)
 2006: Terje Isungset and Didier Petit: Live at Vossajazz (VJ 060112)
 2006: Sonic Stories with Kari Nergaard Bleivik and Rune Mandelid: Feels like night (VJ 060102)
 2006: Sub Trio with John Pål Inderberg, Stein Inge Brækhus and Svein Folkvord: Subtrio (VJ 060122)
 2010: Badnajazz 10 year anniversary album: Eg È Liten Eg, Men Eg Vaoga Meg(VJ100132)

References

External links
  
 English summary, Vossajazz
 Josef Woodard, "Jazz Nordic Style at Vossa Jazz Festival", JazzTimes, 24 April 2011

Voss
Jazz festivals in Norway
Music festivals established in 1973
1973 establishments in Norway
Culture in Hordaland
Annual events in Norway
Spring (season) events in Norway